Daduhe Road is an interchange station on Line 13 and Line 15 of the Shanghai Metro. It is located in Putuo District.

This station opened on 1 November 2014.

This station utilizes side platforms with three tracks running through the middle: one going towards , one going towards , and a third used to store extra carriages.

Station Layout

References

Railway stations in Shanghai
Shanghai Metro stations in Putuo District
Railway stations in China opened in 2014
Line 13, Shanghai Metro